Varanasi–Kolkata Expressway, also known as Varanasi–Ranchi–Kolkata Expressway, is an approved  long, six-lane, greenfield access-controlled expressway, which will connect the holy city of Varanasi in Uttar Pradesh with the capital of West Bengal, Kolkata, through the capital of Jharkhand, Ranchi. It will run almost parallel with the Grand Trunk Road or the Asian Highway 1, and will pass through four states–Uttar Pradesh, Bihar, Jharkhand and West Bengal. It will start from Chandauli district in Uttar Pradesh, and will terminate near Uluberia, Howrah district, West Bengal.

History
The Government of India has given special emphasis on infrastructure development in FY2022–23. To improve connectivity, tourism, development and economic growth in Eastern India, the Government of India planned to build a new expressway from Varanasi to Kolkata through Ranchi. It will pass through four states–Uttar Pradesh, Bihar, Jharkhand and West Bengal. Once completed, these states will see exponential growth with the growth of industries and socio-economic development by promoting employment among people living in the regions, which the regions currently mostly lack altogether. The expressway was earlier slated to be 8-lane. It will be built at a cost of ₹ 23,500 crore, and will be completed by 2027, which was earlier scheduled in the first quarter of 2026.

Route

|-
|UP
|
|-
|BR
|
|-
|JH
|
|-
|WB
|
|-
|Total
|
|}

Uttar Pradesh 
The western terminus of the expressway will be located in Chandauli district near Varanasi in Uttar Pradesh. The western end of the expressway near Barhuli village will be connected with the National Highway 19 (NH-19) and the Varanasi Ring Road. The expressway will cover a total distance of  within Uttar Pradesh.

Bihar 
The expressway will cross the Uttar Pradesh-Bihar border and will enter the Gaya district of Bihar. It will cross the state through the districts of Kaimur, Aurangabad, Rohtas and Gaya. The expressway will cover a total distance of  within Bihar.

Jharkhand 
The expressway will cross the Bihar-Jharkhand border and will enter the Bokaro district of Jharkhand. It will cross the state through the districts of Bokaro, Ramgarh, Hazaribagh and Chatra. The expressway will cover a total distance of  within Jharkhand.

West Bengal
The eastern terminus of the expressway will be located at Uluberia, West Bengal. It will cross the state through the districts of Purulia, Bankura, Paschim Medinipur, Hooghly and Howrah. The expressway will cover a total distance of  within West Bengal.

Construction
The expressway will be fully six-lane and a greenfield project, and will be built using the Engineering, Procurement and Construction (EPC) construction model, which provides and ensures security, liability caps, and a performance guarantee for an infrastructure. For the project, the soil testing work in Jharkhand was conducted in June 2022. It will run almost parallel with the National Highway 19 (NH-19), or the Asian Highway 1 or the Grand Trunk Road. The land acquisition process started in January 2022 on an 80-km section of the expressway, from Tilouthu to Imamganj in Bihar. The National Highways Authority of India (NHAI) released tenders and invited bids in November 2022 for the construction of the expressway. As of March 2023, the project has been divided into 13 packages, and the package division for the West Bengal section is still underway. In Package-1, NHAI issued global tenders, and allocated ₹ 988 crore for the construction of the 27 km stretch from Varanasi Ring Road in Uttar Pradesh to Khainti village in Bihar, and in Package-2, ₹ 945 crore has been allocated for the construction of another 27 km stretch from Khainti village to Palka village in Bihar, wherein it will be built using the Hybrid Annuity Model (HAM) mode of construction. In the West Bengal section, the Government of West Bengal has directed 6 districts of the state to carry out land acquisition for the project, and is underway. Currently, the project is under Detailed Project Report (DPR) preparation and land acquisition. The following table list the project's packages, contractors and their statuses.

Uttar Pradesh/Bihar

Bihar

Jharkhand

The remaining stretch till Kolkata is under package division, land acquisition and DPR preparation.

Benefits
The expressway will benefit Eastern India along with the entire country as follows:
Trade: The expressway will help to boost trade, increase exports and reduce dependency on imports, as it will result in the growth of industries in Eastern India, along the route through which the expressway will pass, especially in the adjoining regions of Kolkata further, and due to its location near the sea with two major ports–Kolkata and Haldia, resulting in a huge benefit for transporting steel and coal to the ports from the famous steel plants and coal mines located in the mineral-rich state of Jharkhand, the Bokaro Steel Plant and coal mines of Dhanbad, thus accelerating economic growth and development in the four states. 
Tourism: It will help to boost tourism by promoting it in places which currently lack, along its route. The alignment of the expressway has been specially made through the backward areas to help facilitate tourism and development, due to a high presence of small tourist spots, dotted across the four states, especially in Jharkhand and the western part of West Bengal, but remain relatively unknown to most people because of lack of accessibility to those areas.
Connectivity: The expressway will create a direct route between Varanasi and Kolkata, by reducing both travel time and distance from 12 to 14 hours to only 6 to 7 hours, and from 690 km to 610 km. It will not only connect Varanasi, but will also connect Kolkata directly with the national capital, as well as Jammu and Kashmir, through a series of expressways, along with this–Purvanchal Expressway, Agra–Lucknow Expressway and Yamuna Expressway to Delhi, and to Jammu and Kashmir via the Delhi–Katra Expressway. In the coming years, instead of Purvanchal and Agra–Lucknow Expressways, the Ganga Expressway will connect Kolkata more faster, as well as with Haridwar. This expressway till Varanasi will also connect Rajasthan via the Chambal Expressway through the Agra–Lucknow Expressway. This series of expressways will result in faster, better and safer commute for both the transport of goods and people, with the rest of the country, from Eastern India.
Protection of the Environment: To protect the green cover, plants and trees will be planted between and on both sides along the entire route of the expressway. In the Kaimur district section of Bihar, a 5 km-long tunnel will be built along the hilly region to avoid deforestation.
Employment: Due to increase in industrial activities along the expressway's route, various agricultural and industrial initiatives will help in the economy and growth of Eastern India. The establishment of these numerous centres will result in multiple job possibilities for thousands of people living in the four states.

Status updates
2019: The expressway's plan was proposed by the  Ministry of Road Transport and Highways (MoRTH).
November 2022: The National Highways Authority of India (NHAI) launched tenders for the project.
January 2023: Land acquisition began for the project.
March 2023: 15 bidders participated to construct 8 packages of the expressway.
March 2023: 11 bidders participated to construct the expressway's Jharkhand to the Jharkhand-West Bengal border section.

See also
 Expressways of India

Notes

References 

Expressways in Uttar Pradesh
Expressways in West Bengal
Proposed expressways in India
Transport in Varanasi
Transport in Kolkata